Clue of the Twisted Candle is a 1960 British crime film directed by Allan Davis and starring Bernard Lee, David Knight and Francis De Wolff. Part of the long-running series of Edgar Wallace Mysteries films made at Merton Park Studios, it is based on the 1918 novel The Clue of the Twisted Candle.

Cast
 Bernard Lee as Superintendent Meredith 
 David Knight as Lexman 
 Francis De Wolff as Ramon Karadis 
 Colette Wilde as Grace 
 Christine Shaw as Linda Buckland 
 Stanley Morgan as Sergeant Anson 
 A. J. Brown as Commissioner of Police
 Richard Caldicot as Fisher 
 Edmond Bennett as Manservant 
 Simon Lack as Jock 
 Anthony Baird as Sergeant Butterfield 
 Gladys Henson as Landlady 
 Alfred Maron as Finch 
 Richard Vernon as Viney 
 Harry Locke as Amis 
 Roy Purcell as Brennan 
 Kenneth Fortescue as Secretary, C.I.D.
 Hazel Hughes as Miss Cunningham

References

Bibliography
 Goble, Alan. The Complete Index to Literary Sources in Film. Walter de Gruyter, 1999.

External links

1960 films
British crime films
1960 crime films
Films set in England
Merton Park Studios films
Films directed by Allan Davis
Films based on British novels
Edgar Wallace Mysteries
1960s English-language films
1960s British films